"Nobody" is a song by Danish DJ and record producer Martin Jensen and British singer-songwriter James Arthur. It was released as a Digital download on 1 March 2019. The song peaked at number 52 on the UK Singles Chart. The song was written by Martin Jensen, Scott Harris, Mads Dyhrberg, Thom Bridges and Philip Plested.

Music video
A music video to accompany the release of "Nobody" was first released onto YouTube on 26 March 2019 at a total length of three minutes and forty-seven seconds.

Charts

Weekly charts

Year-end charts

Certifications

Release history

References

2019 singles
2019 songs
James Arthur songs
Martin Jensen songs
Songs written by James Arthur
Songs written by Scott Harris (songwriter)